Dirk Weise (born 4 February 1952) is an East German sprint canoer who competed in the early 1970s. At the 1972 Summer Olympics in Munich, he finished fourth in the C-1 1000 m event and seventh in the C-2 1000 m event.

References
Sports-reference.com profile

1952 births
Canoeists at the 1972 Summer Olympics
German male canoeists
Living people
Olympic canoeists of East Germany